"While You're Out Looking For Sugar" is a song by Honey Cone and appears on their 1970 album Take Me with You.  It was covered by English singer and songwriter Joss Stone from her sixth studio album, The Soul Sessions Vol. 2. The track was released on 15 June 2012, and is marketed as the lead single from the album.

Music video
A music video to accompany the release of "While You're Out Looking For Sugar" was first released onto YouTube on 1 July 2012 at a total length of three minutes and twenty-one seconds.

Track listing
Digital download
 "While You're Out Looking For Sugar" – 3:17

Chart performance

Release history

References

1970 songs
2012 singles
Honey Cone songs
Joss Stone songs
Songs written by Ron Dunbar
Songs written by Holland–Dozier–Holland